Aarhus Municipality is divided in many different ways, often on layered levels. Politically it is a part of the multi-member constituency Østjyllands Storkreds which covers the eastern coast of East Jutland from Randers to Vejle Fjord. Aarhus Municipality itself is divided in 4 folketing constituencies, Århus Sydkredsen, Århus Vestkredsen, Århus Nordkredsen, Århus Østkredsen, which are again divided in a total of 45 wards, each with one polling station. The diocese of Aarhus is divided in a number of  deaneries of which 4 resides in Aarhus Municipality with a total of 58 parishes. Administratively Aarhus Municipality operates with 25 districts or local communities (Lokalsamfund) which can be amalgamations of parishes, neighborhoods or former and present towns. In addition there are 28 postal districts within the municipality, some of which are colloquially used to denote areas and neighborhoods in the city of Aarhus. The urban area and immediate suburbs of the city of Aarhus are divided in the postal (P.D.) districts Aarhus C, Aarhus N, Aarhus V, Viby J, Højbjerg, Brabrand and Risskov.

The municipality also contains official defined neighborhoods within districts, towns and cities. The city of Aarhus contains the district Midtbyen (lit. English, "Town Centre") within the inner city beltway Ringgaden; roughly equivalent to  P.D. Aarhus C and the southern section of P.D. Aarhus N. Midtbyen is composed of the neighbourhoods Indre By, Vesterbro, Frederiksbjerg, Aarhus Ø, Marselisborg, Nørre Stenbro, Trøjborg, Langenæs and the University campus. The neighborhood Indre By (lit. English, "Inner City"), includes the areas around Centralværkstederne, the Central Station, Aarhus Concert Hall and the historical centre and neighborhood of the Latin Quarter.

Aarhus Municipality in addition use statistical districts which can cover individual settlements, developments or neighborhoods, school districts and elder districts (Ældreområder).

Cities and towns 

Statistics Denmark defines towns or cities as areas with more than 200 residents in a continuous settlement with no more than 200 meters between residential structures. 1 January 2019 there were 19 such areas in Aarhus Municipality, the largest being the city of Aarhus with a population of 277,086, while some 50.000 people lived in urban areas elsewhere in the municipality. In 2013 Beder and Malling was officially counted as a single conurbation for the first time. Towns in the municipality are generally considered satellites of Aarhus.

 Aarhus (277,086)
 Lystrup (10,425) 
 Beder-Malling (8,597)
 Løgten (8,197)
 Mårslet (5,043)

 Solbjerg (4,218)
 Harlev (3,785)
 Hjortshøj (3,669)
 Sabro (3,225)
 Trige (2,810)

 Elev (1,458)
 Lisbjerg (1,057)
 Spørring (1,020)
 Studstrup (873)
 Hårup (823)

 Mejlby (431)
 Mundelstrup (387)
 Ormslev (351)
 Borum (305)

Population figures from Statistics Denmark, 1. January, 2019.

Districts 

Aarhus Municipality defines 21 districts, termed Lokalsamfund, for administrative and statistical purposes, often based on geographical and historical conditions such as historical city limits, larger urban developments and former and existing towns. Several districts are amalgamations of former townships that over time have grown into a single entity or encompassing several suburbs or towns such as Holme-Højbjerg-Skåde which includes the former towns of Holme, Højbjerg and Skåde, all now neighborhoods in Aarhus in a single urban conurbation.

 Åby
 Beder-Malling
 Brabrand-Gellerup
 Harlev-Framlev
 Hårup-Mejlby
 Hasle

 Hasselager-Kolt
 Hjortshøj
 Holme-Højbjerg-Skåde
 Lisbjerg
 Lystrup-Elsted
 Mårslet

 Midtbyen
 Sabro
 Skæring-Egå
 Skejby-Christiansbjerg
 Skødstrup-Løgten
 Solbjerg

 Stavtrup-Ormslev
 Tilst
 Tranbjerg
 Trige-Spørring
 Vejlby-Risskov
 Viby

Postal districts 

There are 28 postal districts within Aarhus Municipality although some only partially such as 8660 Skanderborg and *8464 Galten which are almost entirely within Skanderborg Municipality. References to postal districts can sometimes be used in commonplace vernacular as analogous to city districts or neighborhoods in Aarhus.
 

8000 Aarhus C
8200 Aarhus N
8210 Aarhus V
8330 Beder
8000 Brabrand
8250 Egå
8464 Galten

8462 Harlev
8361 Hasselager
8382 Hinnerup
8530 Hjortshøj
8543 Hornslet
8270 Højbjerg
8362 Hørning

8520 Lystrup
8340 Malling
8320 Mårslet
8300 Odder
8240 Risskov
8471 Sabro
8660 Skanderborg

8355 Solbjerg
8541 Skødstrup
8381 Tilst
8310 Tranbjerg
8380 Trige
8260 Viby
8230 Åbyhøj

Parishes 

Aarhus Municipality contains 58 parishes split between the 4 deaneries Århus Domprovsti, Århus Nordre Provsti, Århus Søndre Provsti and Arhus Vestre Provsti, all part of the Diocese of Aarhus. Parishes on the municipal borders tend to roughly follow those borders with only a few exceptions such as Vitved Parish which is a part of both Aarhus and Skanderborg Municipality.

Aarhus Domsogn
Åby Parish
Astrup Parish
Beder Parish
Borum Parish
Brabrand Parish
Christians Parish
Egå Parish
Elev Parish
Ellevang Parish
Elsted Parish
Fårup Parish
Framlev Parish
Fredens Parish
Gellerup Parish

Harlev Parish
Hasle Parish
Helligånds Parish
Hjortshøj Parish 
Holme Parish
Hvilsted Parish
Kasted Parish
Kolt Parish
Langenæs Parish
Lisbjerg Parish
Lyngby Parish
Lystrup Parish
Malling Parish
Mårslet Parish
Mejlby Parish

Møllevang Parish
Ølsted Parish
Ormslev Parish 
Ravnsbjerg Parish
Risskov Parish
Sabro Parish
Sankt Johannes Parish 
Sankt Lukas Parish
Sankt Markus Parish 
Sankt Pauls Parish
Skåde Parish
Skæring Parish
Skejby Parish
Skelager Parish]
Skjoldhøj Parish 

Skødstrup Parish
Sønder Årslev Parish
Spørring Parish
Tilst Parish
Tiset Parish
Todbjerg Parish
Tranbjerg Parish
Trige Parish
Tulstrup Parish
Vejlby Parish
Viby Parish
Vitved Parish
Vor Frue Parish

References 

Aarhus Municipality